U.S. Route 202 (US 202) is a spur route of US 2. It follows a northeasterly and southwesterly direction stretching from Delaware in the south to Maine in the north and traveling through the states of Pennsylvania, New Jersey, New York, Connecticut, Massachusetts, and New Hampshire. The highway has borne the number 202 since at least 1936. Before this, sections of the highway were designated U.S. Route 122, as it intersected US 22 in New Jersey. Its current designation is based on its intersection with I-395 and SR 15 near US 2 in Maine.

This highway is considerably longer than the eastern segment of US 2 (although considerably shorter than the combined segments of US 2), making it one of several three-digit U.S. highways to be longer than their parent routes.

Route description

|-
|DE
|
|-
|PA
|
|-
|NJ
|
|-
|NY
|
|-
|CT
|
|-
|MA
|
|-
|NH
|
|-
|ME
|
|- class="sortbottom"
|Total
|
|}

Delaware

US 202 begins at an interchange with US 13/US 40 south of Wilmington. It runs north along the same road as Delaware Route 141, then joins with Interstate 95 through Wilmington. North of the city, it exits the freeway onto Concord Pike, heading north; Delaware Route 202 also continues south from this point. US 202 continues north towards the state line as a six-lane arterial road and is lined with numerous strip malls and "big-box stores".

Pennsylvania

US 202 continues north toward West Chester, joining with US 322 after intersecting U.S. Route 1. South of West Chester, US 202/US 322 exits onto a limited-access bypass of the borough; that is the West Chester Bypass, and includes a grade-level intersection at Matlack Street. North of West Chester, US 322 exits, and US 202 continues north as a freeway towards Frazer, where it interchanges with U.S. Route 30 and bends east to head towards Malvern and King of Prussia. In King of Prussia, the highway forms a large, complicated interchange with the Schuylkill Expressway (Interstate 76) the Pennsylvania Turnpike (Interstate 76/Interstate 276), and U.S. Route 422.

The freeway then transitions into a divided highway, passing the King of Prussia shopping mall and heading northeast through commercial areas before splitting into a one-way pair through the streets of Bridgeport and Norristown, crossing the Schuylkill River in the process.

North of Norristown, US 202 continues as a two-lane road heading northeast through the Philadelphia suburbs, passing through Blue Bell and Lower Gwynedd, where it becomes a four-lane highway for about two miles (3 km). East of Lansdale, in Montgomeryville, it turns into an expressway-grade parkway with a parallel trail, which opened in December 2012. It continues northeast toward Doylestown, where it joins an older section of bypass at Pennsylvania Route 611 and proceeds north to the old alignment of US 202 (State Street). It continues as a two-lane road to New Hope, crossing the Delaware River on the New Hope-Lambertville Toll Bridge.

New Jersey

On the toll bridge, US 202 has two lanes in each direction. This segment of US 202 was earlier called the US 202 bypass (as it bypassed the New Hope-Lambertville area) from its original route. The old section of US 202 between New Hope and Ringoes, New Jersey is now Route 179 which is also Old York Road, the first roadway to connect New York City and Philadelphia, Pennsylvania. In 1953, this section of Old York Road was renumbered US 202. A small section of the US 202 bypass was built in 1965 and the old route was renamed Route 179. When the western section of the bypass was built to the Delaware River, the whole former segment was renamed Route 179. The section of the new US 202 freeway section ends once it begins to run concurrently with Route 31 in East Amwell Township. The concurrency runs for five miles (8 km), to Flemington. This stretch, and the 13 miles (21 km) between Flemington and Somerville, is a four-lane divided roadway. In Bridgewater Township, just northwest of Somerville, US 202 has a junction with US 22 towards I-287 South.

At Somerville, the road merges with US 206 at a now-reconfigured Somerville Circle.  Parts of the old traffic circle, which also carries Route 28, remain below the US 202 flyover.  US 202 splits northeastward from US 206 at Bedminster Township and again becomes a two-lane road.

From here to the state line, US 202 parallels, and has largely been supplanted by, I-287, which during its construction dumped traffic onto US 202. US 202 continues through Morristown to Morris Plains with an intersection with Route 53. With a few exceptions, US 202 is maintained by counties rather than the New Jersey Department of Transportation north of Route 53. The only sections of US 202 in New Jersey north of Route 53 that are state-maintained are at the I-80 interchange, at the US 46 intersection, along the Route 23 concurrency, and at the I-287 interchange in Oakland.

US 202 continues past Boonton along the Boonton Turnpike to historic Mountain View in Wayne, where it then picks up Route 23 for about two miles (3 km) and then exits on Black Oak Ridge Road.  It then follows the Paterson-Hamburg Turnpike, Terhune Drive on the east side of Pompton Lake (past the former homes of Cecille B. DeMille and Albert Payson Terhune), and Ramapo Valley Road (more or less paralleling the Ramapo River through Oakland) to Mahwah before crossing the New York state line on the Franklin Turnpike.

New York

US 202 is mostly designated east–west in New York, owing to its greater coverage in those directions.

Franklin Turnpike becomes Orange Avenue in Suffern, and US 202 continues to a block-long wrong-way concurrency with NY 59 before tailing off on Wayne Avenue and heading east toward Haverstraw.  Most of this stretch is a two-lane road.

At Haverstraw, US 202 makes a sharp left turn north onto US 9W and follows US 9W's path for 13 miles (21 km) towards Bear Mountain and then crosses the Hudson River on the Bear Mountain Bridge, running concurrently with US 6, the Grand Army of the Republic Highway. The two wind around Anthony's Nose, briefly forming New York's only three-way concurrency of U.S. highways with US 9 at Peekskill. Afterwards, the two separate for several miles, with US 202 taking the more southerly route through Somers. The highways reunite at Brewster and become a four-lane road for their last few miles before the state line, taking in NY 121 in the process.

Connecticut

At Danbury, US 6 and 202 climb up onto I-84, which had just been joined by the north–south US 7, making a four-way concurrency.  US 7 and 202 split from I-84 and US 6 at Exit 7. It is a two-lane road in southern Brookfield as it follows Federal Road. US 202 diverts from U.S. Route 7 at the next exit to a parallel surface route. The US 7 freeway continues for another  before it rejoins US 202 at the Brookfield/New Milford town line. The now rejoined US 7 and 202 approach New Milford in bucolic Litchfield County, where they once again split.

US 202 continues through Torrington and on to Cherry Brook, where it then runs concurrently with US 44 for several miles before turning northward at Avon.  For the run to the state line, US 202 runs concurrently with Route 10.

Massachusetts

Unlike elsewhere in New England, US 202 is posted as a north–south highway in Massachusetts, as the highway runs mostly in those directions for its length through the state.
US 202 and Route 10 enter the Bay State at the "Congamond Notch" in Southwick, a southward jog in the state line that includes Congamond Lake. North of Westfield, US 202 turns eastward toward Holyoke, crosses the Connecticut River on the Joseph E. Muller Bridge and crosses the South Hadley Falls Interchange, traversing MA 116 and MA 33 toward Belchertown.  After crossing MA 9, it then heads north along the west side of the Quabbin Reservoir through New Salem toward Athol.  This section of US 202 has been dubbed the Daniel Shays Highway, named for a Revolutionary War veteran who led an insurrection against the state government of Massachusetts. US 202 meets Massachusetts Route 2 at Orange, and runs along the two-lane freeway to Phillipston.  There, it diverges to the north again as a two-lane road.

In Massachusetts, US 202 passes through the municipalities of Southwick, Westfield, Holyoke, South Hadley, Granby, Belchertown, Pelham, Shutesbury, New Salem, Orange, Athol, Phillipston, Templeton, and Winchendon.

The stretch of highway through Belchertown, Pelham, Shutesbury, and New Salem opened in 1935 to coincide with the completion and opening of the Quabbin Reservoir. The roadway reaches its closest point to the reservoir itself at the crossing of the Swift River, at the Shutesbury/New Salem town line. Access to the west side of the Quabbin Reservation is made through multiple gates in the three towns. There is no public access, however, to the Prescott Peninsula.

New Hampshire

US 202 is posted as an east–west highway in New Hampshire. It remains a two-lane highway for most of its length in the Granite State.

It heads north, through Rindge, Jaffrey, and Peterborough, to Hillsborough, where it turns eastward along a concurrency with New Hampshire Route 9. The span of the road between Hillsborough and Hopkinton, which passes through Henniker, is among the most deadly sections of roadway in the state. At Concord, New Hampshire, the state capital, US 202 heads north and picks up a concurrency with US 3 for a short time, and then turns eastward again along Interstate 393, a freeway spur that also carries US 4.  The freeway ends short of Chichester, and NH 9 rejoins the two-lane concurrency along with US 4 and 202.

At Northwood, US 202 and NH 9 leave US 4.  NH 9 splits off a few miles later, leaving US 202 to continue alone toward Rochester, where the road jumps up onto the Spaulding Turnpike (NH 16) for a short, non-tolled distance.  US 202 leaves the turnpike two miles (3 km) before the state line at East Rochester.

Maine

US 202 is posted as an east–west highway in Maine.

The highway enters the state by crossing the Salmon Falls River at South Lebanon and bridges the Mousam River in Sanford. The highway then passes through Alfred, Waterboro and Hollis before crossing the Saco River at Salmon Falls. The highway passes through Gorham and crosses the Presumpscot River into South Windham. There is a rotary with U.S. Route 302 at Foster's Corner and an interchange with I-95 at Gray. The highway parallels I-95 through New Gloucester to Auburn and crosses the Androscoggin River into Lewiston, passing near the campus of Bates College. A very short stretch through the latter two cities is four-lane highway, but most of its length in the Pine Tree State consists of two-lane road. Its final miles west of Hampden, including the short overlay on I-395, and concurrency with US 1A also include four-laned segments.

The highway passes through Greene, Monmouth, and Winthrop concurrently with Maine Route 11 and Maine Route 100, and becomes concurrent with State Route 17 at Manchester. US 202 runs concurrently with U.S. Route 201 as it crosses the Kennebec River at Augusta, and shortly thereafter it picks up State Route 3 and State Route 9.  US 202 then ends at I-395 and SR 15 just a half mile east of US 2 and a half mile west of US 1A Bus in Bangor, Maine. I-395's junction with US 1A just southeast of the eastern terminus of US 202 is just two miles south of central Bangor.

History

US 122 was created in 1926, connecting US 22 at Whitehouse Station, New Jersey, with Wilmington, Delaware. It was extended to Haverstraw, New York in 1931 and became part of US 202 in 1934.

In 1964, AASHO approved a request by Delaware to eliminate the portion of US 202 between its intersection with I-295 in Farnhurst and State Road; that stretch was carrying US 13/40/301. US 202 was later shortened so that it ended at I-95 just north of Wilmington. Then in 1984, the route numbering committee approved extending US 202 from there to its intersection with US 13/US 40 in Basin Corner, near New Castle. This intersection is US 202's current terminus.

US 202's path passes near the sites of various important Revolutionary War battles in Delaware and Pennsylvania, such as Cooch's Bridge, near Newark, Delaware; Brandywine, near Philadelphia; and Valley Forge. In New Hampshire, US 202 passes by a historical marker in Antrim commemorating the last surviving soldier of the Revolutionary War.

In Pennsylvania in the early 1960s, a four-lane expressway, the Piedmont Expressway, was proposed that would follow the US 202 corridor. It was to serve as an outer beltway around the Philadelphia area. The project was ultimately cancelled. In its place, the Route 202 Parkway Trail was built. The trail is ultimately expected to connect to the East Coast Greenway via the Neshaminy Creek Trail.

Construction began in November 2008 on a parkway project between Pennsylvania Route 63 in Lower Gwynedd and the existing cloverleaf interchange at the US 202 bypass and PA 611 near Doylestown.  This parkway was planned to consist of a four-lane stretch between Route 63 and Pennsylvania Route 463 and a two-lane parkway the rest of the way that bypasses the boroughs of Chalfont and New Britain. The parkway opened on December 3, 2012.

US 202 originally ended at its junction with US 2/US 1A in Bangor, Maine. In the late 1980s, however, the section of US 202 between I-395 and US 2 was removed from US 202's official routing. Officially, US 202 ends at I-395's exit 3. However, signs designating US 202's termination at US 2 in downtown Bangor, at the corner of Main Street and Hammond Street, still stand today. That intersection is still seen as US 202's end.

Major intersections
Delaware
  in Wilmington Manor
  in Newport
  with a concurrency from Newport to Wilmington
  in Newport

Pennsylvania
  in Chadds Ford Township, with a concurrency with US 322 from Chadds Ford Township to West Goshen Township
  in East Whiteland Township
  in Tredyffrin Township
  in Upper Merion Township

New Jersey
  with a concurrency from the Raritan–Bridgewater Township line to Bedminster Township
  in Bridgewater Township
  in Bridgewater Township
  in Bedminster Township
  in Parsippany-Troy Hills
  in Parsippany-Troy Hills
  in Parsippany-Troy Hills
  in Boonton
  in Montville
  in Oakland

New York
  with a concurrency from the Village of Haverstraw to Highlands
  with a concurrency from Highlands to Peekskill
  with a concurrency from Cortlandt to Peekskill
  with a concurrency from Brewster to the Connecticut state line in Southeast

Connecticut
  with a concurrency from the New York state line in Danbury through the city
  with a concurrency through Danbury
  with a concurrency from Danbury to New Milford
  with a concurrency from Canton to Avon 

Massachusetts, New Hampshire, Maine

See also

Related routes
U.S. Route 2
U.S. Route 302
Special routes of U.S. Route 202

References

Further reading

External links

New Jersey section of U.S. Route 202 Straight Line Diagram from the New Jersey Department of Transportation
An enlarged view of road jurisdiction of US 202, NJ 124 and CR 510 in Morristown
Speed Limits for New Jersey State Roads: U.S. Route 202 in New Jersey
Route 202 at New Milford, CT. Photograph

 
02-2
2
02-2
02-2
02-2